Turtle Lake is a lake in Polk County, in the U.S. state of Minnesota.

The name Turtle Lake comes from the Ojibwe Indians of the area, who thought the lake's outline resembles a turtle.

See also
List of lakes in Minnesota

References

Lakes of Minnesota
Lakes of Polk County, Minnesota